The 2011 World Men's Curling Championship (branded as Ford World Men's Curling Championship 2011 presented by Richardson for sponsorship reasons) was held in Regina, Saskatchewan, Canada from April 2–10, 2011. In the final, Jeff Stoughton skipped the Canadian rink to a 6–5 victory over Scotland's Tom Brewster. The gold medal was Stoughton's second and Canada's 33rd gold medal at the world.

Qualification
 (host country & defending champions)

Top eight teams from the 2010 European Curling Championships

Top two teams from the 2010 Pacific Curling Championships
 (winner)
 (runner-up)

Teams

Round-robin standings

Final round-robin standings

Sweden placed third by virtue of a pre-event draw challenge used to rank teams in case round-robin results failed to provide separation.

Results
All times local (Central Standard Time)

Draw 1
Saturday, April 2, 1:30pm

Draw 2
Saturday, April 2, 7:00pm

Draw 3
Sunday, April 3, 8:30am

Draw 4
Sunday, April 3, 1:30pm

Draw 5
Sunday, April 3, 7:00pm

Draw 6
Monday, April 4, 8:30am

Draw 7
Monday, April 4, 1:30pm

Draw 8
Monday, April 4, 7:30pm

Draw 9
Tuesday, April 5, 8:30am

Draw 10
Tuesday, April 5, 1:30pm

Draw 11
Tuesday, April 5, 7:30pm

Draw 12
Wednesday, April 6, 8:30am

Draw 13
Wednesday, April 6, 1:30pm

Draw 14
Wednesday, April 6, 7:30pm

Draw 15
Thursday, April 7, 8:30am

Draw 16
Thursday, April 7, 1:30pm

Draw 17
Thursday, April 7, 7:30pm

Tiebreaker
Friday, April 8, 1:30pm

Playoffs

1 vs. 2
Friday, April 8, 7:30pm

3 vs. 4
Saturday, April 9, 12:30pm

Semifinal
Saturday, April 9, 5:00pm

Bronze medal game
Sunday, April 10, 12:00pm

Gold medal game
Sunday, April 10, 5:00pm

Top five player percentages

References
Notes

Sources

External links
2011 WMCC Home Page
Official Event Information  by World Curling Federation

Ford World Mens Curling Championship, 2011
World Men's Curling Championship
Ford World Men's Curling Championship
Sports competitions in Regina, Saskatchewan
International curling competitions hosted by Canada
Curling in Saskatchewan
Ford World Men's Curling Championship
April 2011 sports events in Canada